Magi-Nation (or Magi Nation or MagiNation) may refer to:
Magi-Nation Duel a card game released August 2000
Magi Nation (video game) a video game adaptation released March 2001
Magi-Nation (TV series) a cartoon with 52 episodes released from 2007